John Humphrey (born 31 January 1961) is an English former professional footballer who played as a defender from 1979 until 1997.

He notably played for Crystal Palace after he was controversially made part of the deal for Charlton being allowed to continue playing at their ground, where he featured in the Premier League. He also played in the Football League for Wolverhampton Wanderers, Charlton Athletic, Reading, Gillingham and Brighton & Hove Albion, before finishing his career in Non-league for Chesham United and Dulwich Hamlet.

Personal life
Pupil at Aylestone High School, Willesden Another product of the Brent pipeline along with others such as Bobby Fisher, Cyril Regis, John Barnes, Ricky Hill and Stuart Pearce. And
More recently Raheem  Sterling. He is now the Head of Football at Highgate School, North London.
He is also a keen magician.

References

Since 1888... The Searchable Premiership and Football League Player Database (subscription required)

1961 births
Living people
English footballers
Association football defenders
Premier League players
Wolverhampton Wanderers F.C. players
Charlton Athletic F.C. players
Crystal Palace F.C. players
Reading F.C. players
Gillingham F.C. players
Brighton & Hove Albion F.C. players
Chesham United F.C. players
Dulwich Hamlet F.C. players